Melissa Thomas is an Australian actress.

Performance career

Her film work as an extra includes: Ghost Town (2000), Swimming Upstream (2003), Thank God He Met Lizzie (1997), and Dallas Doll (1993).

Her television work includes roles in: All Saints (2003) (non-speaking role), Sweat (Australian TV series) (1996) playing Sandy Fricker, Late for School (1992) playing Lily Price, Brides of Christ (1990) playing Brigid Maloney, A Country Practice (1990) (non-speaking), Family and Friends (1990), E Street (1989) and G.P. (1989) (non-speaking).

Thomas has also worked on Holy Cross (2003). Footballers' Wives (2002), and GMT: Greenwich Mean Time, as well as presenting  on Level 23 (1994), on The Defenders: Choice of Evil (1998).

She appeared in the Heath Ledger episode of E! True Hollywood Story, speaking about her former coworker.

Filmography

References

External links

Australian television actresses
Australian film actresses
Year of birth missing (living people)
Living people
Australian television producers
Australian women television producers